Mount Bellingshausen is a conspicuous cone-shaped mountain, 1,380 m, standing 5 nautical miles (9 km) northeast of Mount Priestley between Larsen and David Glaciers, in the Prince Albert Mountains of Victoria Land, Antarctica. Discovered by the Discovery expedition, 1901–04, led by Scott, and named by him after Admiral Thaddeus Bellingshausen, leader of the Russian expedition of 1819–21.

References

Mountains of Victoria Land
Scott Coast